Ascher Otto Wagner (12 October 1930, in Vienna – 27 May 2000, in London) was an Austrian and British mathematician, specializing in the theory of finite groups and finite projective planes.

Ascher Wagner received his Ph.D. in 1958 with dissertation Some Problems on Projective Planes and Related Topics in the Theory of Algebraic Operations supervised by Kurt Hirsch. Wagner was a faculty member at the University of London and then at the University of Birmingham.

In 1958 he married Gillian Mary Jaidka (1929–1993) in Hampstead, London.

Selected publications

References

1930 births
2000 deaths
20th-century British mathematicians
Alumni of the University of London
Academics of the University of London
Academics of the University of Birmingham